The dwarf mulch-skink (Glaphyromorphus pumilus)  is a species of skink found in Queensland in Australia.

References

Glaphyromorphus
Reptiles described in 1887
Taxa named by George Albert Boulenger